San Antonio de Flores is a municipality in the Honduran department of Choluteca.

Municipalities of the Choluteca Department